The Fourth Council of the Lateran or Lateran IV was convoked by Pope Innocent III in April 1213 and opened at the Lateran Palace in Rome on 11 November 1215. Due to the great length of time between the council's convocation and its meeting, many bishops had the opportunity to attend this council, which is considered by the Roman Catholic Church to be the twelfth ecumenical council. The council addressed a number of issues, including the sacraments, the role of the laity, the treatment of heretics, and the organization of the church.

Background
Innocent III first mooted organizing an ecumenical council in November 1199. In his letter titled Vineam Domini, dated 19 April 1213, the Pope writes of the urgent need to recover the Holy Land and reform the Church. The letter, which also served as a summons to an ecumenical council, was included alongside the Pope's papal bull Quia maior. In preparing for the council, the Pope spearheaded the extensive refurbishment of the old St. Peter's Basilica, which he designated as the "centrepiece for display and decoration" during the council. The lunette of the main door leading to the tomb of St. Peter had engravings of Old Testament prophets and twenty-four bishops, alongside the messages, "Feed your Sheep" and "This is the Door of the Sheep".

Proceedings
Innocent III deliberately chose for the Fourth Council to meet in November, during which there were numerous feast days. A preliminary legal session took place on 4 November, while the opening ceremony of the council was held on St. Martin's Day and began with a private morning Mass. Afterwards, at the start of the first plenary session in the Lateran Palace, the Pope led the singing of "Veni Creator Spiritus" and preached about Jesus' words to his disciples at the Last Supper, quoting from Luke 22. In his next two sermons, one on the need to recover the Holy Land and the other on dealing with heretics,  the Pope was joined on stage by Raoul of Mérencourt and Thedisius of Agde respectively.

On 14 November, there were violent scenes between the partisans of Simon de Montfort among the French bishops and those of the Count of Toulouse. Raymond VI of Toulouse, his son (afterwards Raymond VII), and Raymond-Roger of Foix attended the council to dispute the threatened confiscation of their territories; Bishop Foulques and Guy de Montfort (brother of Simon de Montfort) argued in favour of the confiscation. All of Raymond VI's lands were confiscated, save Provence, which was kept in trust to be restored to Raymond VII. Pierre-Bermond of Sauve's claim to Toulouse was rejected and Toulouse was awarded to de Montfort, while the lordship of Melgueil was separated from Toulouse and entrusted to the bishops of Maguelonne. 

The next day, in a ceremony attended by many council participants, the Pope consecrated the Basilica of Santa Maria in Trastevere, which had been rebuilt by Callixtus II. Four days later, the anniversary celebration at St. Peter's Basilica brought together such a large gathering that the Pope himself had trouble entering the premises.

The second plenary session was held on 20 November; the Pope was scheduled to preach about church reform, but proceedings were disrupted by bishops who opposed the designation of Frederick II as Holy Roman Emperor. The council concluded on 30 November, Saint Andrew's Day, during which the Pope preached on the Nicene Creed and concluded his remarks by raising up a relic of the True Cross. The archbishop of Mainz attempted to interrupt the speech, although he complied with the Pope's raising of his handa command to stay silent.

Outcomes
Lateran IV had three objectives: crusading, Church reform, and combating heresy. The seventy-one Lateran canons, which were not debated, were only formally adopted on the last day of the council; according to Anne J. Duggan, the "scholarly consensus" is that they were drafted by Innocent III himself. They cover a range of themes including Church reform and elections, taxation, matrimony, tithing, simony, and Judaism. After being recorded in the papal registers, the canons were quickly circulated in law schools. Effective application of the decrees varied according to local conditions and customs.

Canons
 Canon 1 (De fide catholica or On the catholic faith): Infallibly defined the teaching of the Catholic Church on transubstantiation, the doctrine which describes in precise scholastic language the transformation by which the bread and wine offered in the sacrament of the Eucharist becomes the actual blood and body of Christ.
 Canon 2 (De errore abbatis Ioachim or On the error of abbot Joachim): Condemnation of the doctrines of Joachim of Fiore and Amalric of Bena.
 Canon 3 (De haereticis or On heretics): Procedure and penalties against heretics and their protectors. If those suspected of heresy should neglect to prove themselves innocent, they are excommunicated. If they continue in the excommunication for twelve months they are to be condemned as heretics. Princes are to swear that they will banish all whom the church points out as heretics.
 Canon 4 (De superbia Graecorum contra Latinos or On the pride of Greeks towards Latins): Exhortation to the Greeks to reunite with the Roman Church.
 Canon 5 (De dignitate patriarcharum or On the dignity of patriarchs): Proclamation of the papal primacy recognized by all antiquity. After the pope, primacy is attributed to the patriarchs in the following order: Constantinople, Alexandria, Antioch, and Jerusalem.
 Canon 6 (De conciliis provincialibus or On provincial councils): Provincial councils must be held annually for the reform of morals, especially those of the clergy. This was to ensure that the canons adopted would be implemented.
 Canon 7 (De correctione excessuum or On the conviction of offences): Sets down the responsibility of the bishops for the reform of their subjects. 
 Canon 8 (De inquisitionibus or On inquests): Procedure in regard to accusations against ecclesiastics.
 Canon 9 (De diversis ritibus in eadem fide or On different rites within the same faith): Celebration of public worship in places where the inhabitants belong to nations following different rites.
 Canon 10 (De praedicatoribus instituendis or On appointing preachers): Ordered the appointment of preachers and penitentiaries to assist in the discharge of the episcopal functions of preaching and penance.
 Canon 11 (De magistris scholasticis or On schoolmasters): The decree of 1179, about a school in each cathedral having been entirely ignored, was re-enacted, and a lectureship in theology ordered to be founded in every cathedral.
 Canon 12 (De communibus capitulis monacborum or On general chapters of monks): Abbots and priors are to hold their general chapter every three years.
 Canon 13 (De novis religionibus prohibitis or On the prohibition against new religious orders): Forbade the establishment of new religious orders.
 Canons 14 (De incontinentia clericorum punienda or On punishing clerical incontinences): Set out guidelines for punishing incontinence.
 Canon 15 (De arcenda ebrietate clericorum or On preventing drunkenness among the clergy): Prohibited both drunkenness and the hunting of birds and dogs.
 Canon 16 (De indumentis clericorum or On the dress of clerics): Prescribed dressing for clergy members and prohibited gambling and spectating theatrical performances.
 Canon 17 (De comessationibus praelatorum et negligentia eorum super diviniis officiis or On prelates' feasts and their negligence at divine services): Admonished clerics who excessively engaged in non-religious activities while infrequently attending mass.
 Canon 18 (De indicio sanguinis et duelli clericis interdicto or On sentences involving either the shedding of blood or a duel being forbidden to clerics): Clerics may neither pronounce nor execute a sentence of death. Nor may they act as judges in extreme criminal cases, or take part in matters connected with judicial tests and trials by ordeal.
 Canon 19 (Ne ecclesiae mundanis suppellectilibus exponantur or That profane objects may not be introduced into churches): Household goods must not be stored in churches unless there be an urgent necessity. Churches, church vessels, and the like must be kept clean.
 Canon 20 (De chrismate et eucharistia sub sera conservanda or On keeping the chrism and the eucharist under lock and key): Ordering that the chrism and the Eucharist to be kept under lock and key, with a three-month suspension for leaving it out carelessly, and worse if "anything unspeakable" were to happen to it.
 Canon 21 (De confessione facienda et non revelanda a sacerdote et saltem in pascha communicando or On confession being made, and not revealed by the priest, and on communicating at least at Easter): Introduced the mandate "Omnis utriusque sexus", which commands every Christian who has reached the years of discretion to confess all his, or her, sins at least once a year to their own priest. This canon did no more than confirm earlier legislation and custom (of the previous century), although it is sometimes incorrectly quoted as commanding the use of sacramental confession for the first time.
 Canon 22 (Quod infirmi prius provideant animae quam corpori or That the sick should provide for the soul before the body): Before prescribing medicine for the sick, physicians shall be bound under pain of exclusion from the church, to exhort their patients to call in a priest, and thus provide for their spiritual welfare. 
 Canon 23 (Quod ecclesia cathedralis vel regularis ultra tres menses non vacet or That a cathedral church or a church of the regular clergy is not to remain vacant for more than three months): Mandated that a church is not to be without a prelate for more than three months. 
 Canon 24 (De electione facienda per scrutinium vel compromissum or On making an election by ballot or by agreement): Mandated that pastors are to be either elected or chosen by a committee acting on behalf of the congregation. 
 Canon 25 (Quod electio facta per saecularem potestatem non valeat): Specified that spiritual leaders may not be selected by non-Christians. 
 Canon 26 (De poema indigue confirmantis electionem or On the penalty for improperly confirming an election): Laid out the punishments for not adhering to electoral guidelines. 
 Canon 27 (De instructione ordinandorum or On the instruction of ordinands): Stressed the need for bishops to properly guide their disciples and not ordain the "ignorant and unformed". 
 Canon 28 (Quod compellantur cedere qui postulaverunt licentiam cedendi or That those who have asked for permission to resign are to be compelled to do so): Allowed members of the clergy to resign, with the caveat that their resignations would be irreversible. 
 Canon 29 (Quod nullus babeat duo beneficia cum cura annexa or That nobody may hold two benefices with the cure of souls attached): Forbade the holding of several ecclesiastical offices at any given time. 
 Canon 30 (De idoneitate instituendorum in ecclesiis or On the suitability of those instituted to churches): Forbade "unworthy persons" from working in churches. 
 Canon 31 (De filiis canonicorum non instituendis cum patribus or On not instituting the sons of canons with their fathers): Prohibited clergymen from having their sons succeed them. 
 Canon 32 (Ut patroni compententem portionem dimittant clericis or That patrons shall leave a suitable portion to clerics): Ruled that priests are entitled to a "fitting portion from the revenues of the church". 
 Canon 33 (De procurationibus non accipiendis sine visitatione or On not receiving procurations without a visitation being made): Dictated that bishops may only expect to be reasonably remunerated when visiting churches.
 Canon 34 (De subditis non gravandis sub praetextu servitii alicuius or On not burdening subjects under the pretext of some service): Forbade prelates from charging for superfluous services. 
 Canon 35 (De causa appellationis exprimenda or On stating the grounds for an appeal): Defendants must not appeal without good cause before sentence is given; if they do, they are to be charged expenses. 
 Canon 36 (Quod iudex possit interlocutoriam et comminatoriam sententiam revocare or That a judge can revoke an interlocutory and a comminatory sentence): Judges may revoke comminatory and interlocutory sentences and proceed with the case. 
 Canon 37 (De litteris non impetrandis ultra duas diaetas et sine specialis mandato or On not procuring letters which entail more than two days' journey and are without a special mandate): Declared that plaintiffs may not impede trials by calling on faraway witnesses, unless the defendant agrees to it. 
 Canon 38 (De scribendis actis, ut probari possint or On writing acts so that they can be proved): Stipulated that trial proceedings must be recorded in writing.
 Canon 39 (De restitutione danda contra possessorem, quae non rapuit ipse or On granting restitution against a person in possession who was not the robber): Ruled that stolen goods have to be returned to their original owner.
 Canon 40 (De vera possessione or On true possession): Ruled that plaintiffs still have rightful ownership of goods withheld from them for more than a year.
 Canon 41 (De continuatione bonae fidei in omni praescriptione or On continuing good faith in every prescription): Declared that all prescriptions have to be made in good faith.
 Canon 42 (De saeculari iustitia or On secular justice): Stressed that religious law should not interfere with secular law, and vice versa.
 Canon 43 (Ne sine causa clericus fidelitatem laico faciat or On a cleric not doing fealty to a layman without good reason): Clerics should not take oaths of fealty to laymen without lawful cause.
 Canon 44 (Quod constitutiones principum non praeiudicent ecclesiis or That the ordinances of princes should not be prejudicial to churches): Lay princes should not usurp the rights of churches.
 Canon 45 (Patronus qui clericum ecclesiae occiderit vel mutilaverit, ius patronatus omittit or A patron who kills or mutilates a cleric of a church loses his right of patronage): Forbade patrons of churches from killing clergymen.
 Canon 46 (De talliis a clericis non exigendis or On not exacting taxes from clerics): Laid out exceptions to a Lateran III canon exempting clergymen from taxation.
 Canon 47 (De forma excommunicandi or On the form of an excommunication): Decreed that excommunication may be imposed only after warning in the presence of suitable witnesses and for manifest and reasonable cause.
 Canon 48 (De more recusandi iudicem or On how to challenge a judge): Laid out the guidelines to challenging a judge.
 Canon 49 (De poena excommunicantis iniuste or On the punishment for excommunicating someone unjustly): Stipulated that excommunication is to be neither imposed nor lifted for payment.
 Canons 50–52: There had been kings of France and Castile who had repudiated their wives and "remarried" with serious public consequences. Marriage, impediments of relationship, publication of banns were addressed in Canon 50.
 Canon 53 (De bis qui praedia sua in fraudem decimarum dant aliis excolenda or On those who give their fields to others to be cultivated so as to avoid paying tithes): The council condemned those who had their property cultivated by others (non-Christians) in order to avoid tithes.
 Canon 54 (Ut decimae ante tributa solvantur or That tithes should be paid before taxes): Ruled that tithe payments have priority over all other taxes and dues. 
 Canon 57 (De interpretandis privilegiorum verbis or On interpreting the words of privileges): Gave precise instructions on the interpretation of the privilege of celebrating religious services during interdict, enjoyed by some orders.
 Canon 63 (De simonia or On simony): Prohibited simony, in that no fees are to be exacted for the consecration of bishops, the blessing of abbots or the ordination of clerics.
 Canon 64 (De eadem circa monachos et sanctimoniales or On the same with regard to monks and nuns): Ruled that monks and nuns may not require payment for their entry into the religious life.
 Canon 67 (De usuris Iudaeorum or On the usury of Jews): Prevented Jews from charging "extortionate and excessive interest".
 Canon 68 (Ut Iudaei discernantur a christianis in habitu or That Jews should be distinguished from Christians in their dress): Mandated a special dress code for Jews and Saracens to distinguish them from Christians so that no Christian shall come to marry them ignorant of who they are.

 Canon 69 (Ne Iudaei publicis officiis praeficiantur or That Jews are not to hold public offices): Disqualified Jews from holding public offices, incorporating into ecclesiastical law a decree of the Holy Christian Empire.
 Canon 70 (Ne conversi ad fidem de Iudaeis veterem ritum Iudaeorum retineant or That converts to the faith among the Jews may not retain their old rite): Prescribed measures to prevent converted Jews from returning to their former belief.
 Canon 71 (Expeditio pro recuperanda Terra sancta or Expedition for the recovery of the holy Land): Designated 1 June 1217 as the start of the Fifth Crusade. This canon was disregarded by canonists like Johannes Teutonicus Zemeke, who omitted it from his collection of Lateran IV canons, Compilatio quarta, and Damasus Hungarus, who wrote, "This constitution is temporary, and I do not care to gloss it."

Records
While the proceedings were not officially recorded, unlike in previous councils, evidence of the events have been found in various manuscripts by observers of the council. The Chronica Majora by Matthew Paris contains a line drawing of one of the sessions at the council which his abbot William of St Albans had personally attended. An extensive eyewitness account by an anonymous German cleric was copied into a manuscript that was published in 1964, in commemoration of the Second Vatican Council, and is now housed at the University of Giessen.

Legacy
Henry of Segusio likened the council to the "four great councils of antiquity". Lateran IV is sometimes referred to as the "Great Council of the Lateran" due to the presence of 404 or 412 bishops (including 71 cardinals and archbishops) and over 800 abbots and priors representing some eighty ecclesiastical provinces, together with 23 Latin-speaking prelates from the Eastern Orthodox Church and representatives of several monarchs, including Frederick II, Otto IV, the Latin Emperor of Constantinople, John, King of England, Andrew II of Hungary, Philip II of France, and the kings of Aragon, Cyprus, and Jerusalem. This made it the largest ecumenical council between the Council of Chalcedon and the Second Vatican Council; Anne J. Duggan writes that "it was the largest, most representative, and most influential council assembled under papal leadership before the end of the fourteenth century." According to F. Donald Logan, "the Fourth Lateran Council was the most important general council of the church in the Middle Ages", whose effects "were felt for centuries."

References

Citations

Bibliography

 
 
 
 
 
 
  
 
 
 
 
 
 

1215 in Europe
13th century in the Papal States
4
Lateran 4
Lateran IV
Catholicism and Judaism
Christian antisemitism in the Middle Ages
Pope Innocent III
Otto IV, Holy Roman Emperor
John, King of England
Philip II of France